is a railway station on the Yurikamome Line, in Kōtō, Tokyo, Japan. It is numbered "U-15".

Station layout
The station consists of an elevated island platform.

History
The station opened on 27 March 2006.

Surrounding area
The area around the station is the site of ongoing building projects, part of long-term plans to develop the Ariake area, which lies to the east of the Odaiba complex of residential, commercial, and research facilities.

References

External links
 Official information site

Railway stations in Tokyo
Railway stations in Japan opened in 2006
Yurikamome